In mathematics, Shimura's reciprocity law, introduced by , describes the action of ideles of imaginary quadratic fields on the values of modular functions at singular moduli.  It forms a part of the Kronecker Jugendtraum, explicit class field theory for such fields.  There are also higher-dimensional generalizations.

References

Theorems in number theory